Fat Lips (or Fatlips) is the name given to a legendary spirit dwelling in Dryburgh Abbey in Berwickshire, Scotland.

The spirit was associated with a hermit woman who took up residence in a vault among the ruins of the abbey some time after the 1745 Jacobite rising. The woman claimed that the spirit tidied the room whilst she was away, and kept the cell she lived in dry by stamping moisture away from the ground with his heavy iron boots.

References

Fairies
Scottish folklore
English legendary creatures
Northumbrian folklore
Northumbrian folkloric beings

de:Redcap
fr:Bonnet-Rouge
it:Redcap
ja:レッドキャップ
pt:Barrete vermelho